In 2009, Tourism Queensland promoted the Great Barrier Reef as a global tourism destination with a website encouraging people worldwide to apply for The Best Job In The World, to be a "Caretaker of the Islands" to "house-sit" the islands of the Great Barrier Reef for half a year, based on Hamilton Island.
The winner was Ben Southall,
who beat over 34 thousand candidates.

Benefits
Job benefits included a large salary, free lodging in a multi million-dollar villa, and transportation there and around the islands. The application process required a web video to be submitted, available publicly for consideration for the position. The job duties listed were primarily publicity-related with web videos, blogging, and photo diaries. The submission web site crashed two days following the launch of the campaign, from excessive visits and application video uploading.

Public interest
Interest continued for months. On 11 February 2009, Christopher Grima jumped off the South Causeway Bridge in Fort Pierce in Florida. The police report said that he "wanted to capture a video of himself jumping off the bridge, to gain attention of the recruiters" for this job. He quickly received a summons for breach of the peace / disorderly conduct. More marketing-savvy applicants created blogs and established Facebook groups to create buzz about themselves. Two hoaxes also fueled interest. Tourism Queensland invested US$1m in the campaign and generated US$70m of global publicity just one month after the campaign's launch.

Applicants
Over 35,000 applications were received from over 200 countries, and whittled down to 16 finalists (including one chosen by an on-line vote).  Finalists came from Australia (two), United States (two), United Kingdom, Canada, Ireland, the Netherlands, Germany, New Zealand, Taiwan, India, China, Japan, France and South Korea.  Ten were male and their ages ranged from 20 to 39.  The candidates were interviewed on the island starting 3 May 2009. The United Kingdom finalist Ben Southall, 34, a charity fundraiser and ostrich-rider from Petersfield, Hampshire, UK, was appointed as the new caretaker of the island on 6 May 2009.

Publicity
By the campaign's end, it has generated more than $200 million in global publicity value for Tourism Queensland. Brisbane advertising agency CumminsNitro  was awarded three top awards at the Cannes International Advertising Festival. The campaign was acknowledged as very successful. BBC Television made a one-hour documentary about the final stages of the campaign which was directed by Agnieszka Piotrowska.  Narrated by Toby Stephens, the film was broadcast on 2 July 2009 on BBC1 at 9pm, achieving the highest viewing figures for the whole week.

Winner
The winner was Ben Southall, from the United Kingdom.  In the last week of his paradise job, he was stung by an Irukandji jellyfish. Although lethal cases are known, he made a full recovery.

Southall is now an Ambassador of Queensland Tourism and took residency in Queensland after the six-month period on the island had ended. Since then Ben has established himself as an adventure advocate in Australia taking on extreme adventures around the world including a 1600 km kayak along the Great Barrier Reef in 2011, running a number of marathons around the country. He set a world record to climb the tallest mountain in each Australian state (8) in the shortest ever time in April 2013 - the Aussie 8 expedition took 8 days. His website follows his adventures around the planet.

In 2008 Southall circumnavigated Africa in a Land Rover, known as Colonel Mustard, covering 65,000 km. He climbed the five highest mountains on the continent and ran five marathons in the year raising $50,000 (AUS) for charity.

He married Sophee McPhee in November 2012 back on Hamilton Island where he lived as the Caretaker of the Islands of the Great Barrier Reef.

Advertising awards
In 2010 the advertising campaign was awarded two prestigious D&AD Black Pencil Awards.

See also

Tourism in Australia

References

External links

Tourist attractions in Queensland
Tourism in Australia
Promotion and marketing communications
2009 introductions
Whitsunday Islands